This is a list of executive search firms.  

A 2022 industry newsletter ranking of the largest executive search firms in the Americas listed estimated revenues of 50 firms, with top five being: Korn Ferry, Russell Reynolds Associates, Spencer Stuart, Heidrick & Struggles, and Egon Zehnder. Each of them had more than U.S. $450 million in estimated revenues, and more than 300 consultants. 

Forbes partnered with market research company Statista to determine an annual ranking of America’s best executive recruiting firms—the top 150 executive search firms specialized in filling positions with salaries of at least $100,000.

Notable executive search firms include:

Egon Zehnder
Heidrick & Struggles
Emerson Chase
Korn Ferry
Lindauer
Neumann International
PageGroup
R. William Funk & Associates
Randstad India
Rosenzweig & Company
Russell Reynolds Associates
Spencer Stuart
Stanton Chase
Transearch International
Whitehead Mann
Stiles Associates

References

Lists of service companies